Hydrogen darkening is a physical degradation of the optical properties of glass. Free hydrogen atoms are able to bind to the SiO2 silica glass compound forming hydroxyl (OH)—a chemical compound that interferes with the passage of light through the glass.

The problem is particularly relevant to fiber optic cables—particularly in oil and gas wells where fiber optic cables are used for distributed temperature sensing (DTS). Hydrogen can be present due to the cracking of hydrocarbons in the well.  The darkening of the fiber can distort the DTS reading and possibly render the DTS system inoperable due to the optical loss budget being exceeded.

To prevent this, coatings such as carbon are applied to the fiber, and hydrogen capturing gels are used to buffer the fiber, and other proprietary techniques may be used to prevent hydrogen atoms from reaching the glass fiber via the cable sheath.

References 

 Elizabeth Ann Bonnell (2015). Temperature dependent behavior of optical loss from hydrogen species in optical fibers at high temperature. (masters thesis), 2015-04-07.

Sensors
Fiber optics
Petroleum production
Glass chemistry
Glass engineering and science
Hydroxides